American based electronic dance musicians The Knocks have released three studio albums, six EPs and thirty-five singles. The duo began their career as remixers in the city of New York, United States, eventually signing to their first ever major record label. Their 2010 single "Dancing With The DJ" was their first instant online success. Philadelphia hiphop band Chiddy Bang sampled The Knocks' "Blackout" for their single "Here We Go" (featuring Q-Tip) from their EP The Preview. Chiddy Bang subsequently sampled The Knocks' "When You've Got Music" and "Dancing with the DJ" for their mixtape Peanut Butter and Swelly. After the success of "Dancing With The DJ", their debut extended play, entitled Magic was released in 2011.

In 2012, their cover of "Midnight City" by M83 featuring vocals by Mandy Lee, had 10,000 downloads in its first week on the website SoundCloud. In June, the duo took the number one spot on the website HypeMachine with the track "Learn to Fly", which reached 100,000 plays on SoundCloud within a week of its release. "Geronimo", a collaboration with French producer Fred Falke, was released on Kitsuné Records in July 2012. Later on in November 2012, the duo were featured alongside pop sensation St Lucia in Icona Pop's song "Sun Goes Down", which was released on their debut album Icona Pop. It was later revealed that the song was the duo's very first feature and co-produced track.

Afterwards, the duo released another successful single, featuring St. Lucia, entitled "Modern Hearts", in the beginning of 2013 and earned the group another number-one placing on HypeMachine and reached the 100,000 plays mark on SoundCloud in four days. Within the same year, another single, entitled "Comfortable", which featured vocals from X Ambassadors, was released, which was the made the lead single of their second extended play, also entitled "Comfortable".

In 2014, The Knocks released a single on Neon Gold Records/Big Beat Records, "Classic", featuring alt-pop duo POWERS. An official video was released that paid homage to video game The Sims. After it was released, they released a "Powers Sunset Version" which followed on shortly afterwards. This followed the songs "Dancing with Myself", "Collect My Love", featuring Alex Newell, and "Time" being released in early 2015. These tracks made up their third EP, entitled So Classic, which was released in April 2015. Throughout the rest of the year, the duo began working on their debut album, entitled 55, which featured collaborations from the likes of Fetty Wap, Cam'ron, Wyclef Jean, Carly Rae Jepsen, Matthew Koma, Magic Man, Alex Newell, POWERS, Phoebe Ryan, Justin Tranter, Walk the Moon, and X Ambassadors. Once released, there was an explosive post-success for the duo, as songs from the album were promoted on advertisements and shows across the US, as well as producing musical material for other artists for the first time, including Carly Rae Jepsen and Wyclef Jean.

Studio albums

Extended plays

Mixtapes

Singles

As lead artist

As featured artist

Promotional singles

Guest appearances

Songwriting and Production Credits

Remixes

 The 1975 - "Girls"
Carly Rae Jepsen – "All That"
 Passion Pit - "Sleepy Head"
 Dragonette – "Let It Go"
 St. Lucia - "Elevate"
 Ellie Goulding – "Starry Eyed"
 Foster the People – "Pumped Up Kicks"
 Nonono - "Pumpin Blood"
 Goldroom – "Only You Can Show Me"
 Wale and Lady Gaga - "Chillin"
 Grouplove – "Ways to Go"
 Haim – "Forever"
 Haim – "If I Could Change Your Mind"
 Katy Perry – "I Kissed a Girl"
 Louis The Child – It's Strange 
 Monsieur Adi feat A*M*E – "What's Going On"
 Of Monsters & Men – "Little Talks"
 Santigold – "The Keepers"
 Future Islands - "Haunted By You"
 Skrillex and Diplo  – Where Are Ü Now 
 Post Malone - "White Iverson"
 Taylor Swift – "Welcome to New York"
 X Ambassadors - "Renegades"
 Tegan & Sara – "Closer"
 The Sound of Arrows – "Wonders"
 Two Door Cinema Club – "Sleep Alone"
 Youngblood Hawke – "We Come Running"
 The 1975 – "Girls"
 Tove Lo – "Not On Drugs"
 Sofi Tukker – "Drinkee"
 Phoebe Ryan – "Chronic"
 Justin Bieber – "Company"
 Tove Lo - "Cool Girl"
 Charli XCX and Troye Sivan - "1999"
 Odesza - "Falls"
 Blu DeTiger - "In My Head" (The Knocks Block Party Mix)
 Absofacto - "Dissolve"
 Milck - "If I Ruled The World"

References 

The Knocks songs
Discographies of American artists